Laureles may refer to:

 Laureles, Ñeembucú, a town in Paraguay
 Laureles, Texas, a census-designated place in Cameron County
 Laureles F.C., a football club in Uruguay
 Laureles (Mexibús), a BRT station in Ecatepec, Mexico

See also
 Laurel (disambiguation)